The stripe-headed finesnout ctenotus (Ctenotus striaticeps)  is a species of skink found in the Northern Territory and Queensland in Australia.

References

striaticeps
Reptiles described in 1978
Taxa named by Glen Milton Storr